3-Minute Warning was an American professional wrestling tag team consisting of cousins Matt Anoa'i and Eddie Fatu, most notable for their time with WWF/E under their ring names of Rosey and Jamal, respectively. As they were the members of the prominent Anoa'i family, Rosey was an older brother of current WWE wrestler Roman Reigns and Jamal was also a brother of Rikishi and an uncle to nephews Jimmy and Jey Uso and Solo Sikoa; all of them today currently wrestle as The Bloodline.

History
Anoa'i and Fatu trained together at the Wild Samoan professional wrestling school operated by members of their family. When their training was completed they debuted in their uncle Afa's World Xtreme Wrestling (WXW), where Matt held the WXW Tag Team Championship as one half of the Samoan Gangstas with another cousin, Lloyd Anoa'i.

In 1996, Matt and Eddie were brought into the World Wrestling Federation (WWF) together to take part in an angle with Eddie's brother Solofa Fatu who was working under just his family name with a gimmick that he wanted to be a positive influence on kids and that he wanted to "make a difference" in inner city neighborhoods. Matt and Eddie were brought in as two silent "gangsters" who would watch Fatu's matches from the entrance aisle and stalk him around arenas, making him nervous. Neither gimmick lasted long, and Matt and Eddie were sent to the WWF's Heartland Wrestling Association (HWA) "farm league". There they used the individual names Ekmo Fatu (Eddie) and Kimo (Matt), with the team name Island Boyz. They held the HWA Tag Team Championship once, and for a time Haku served as their manager. They left HWA together, and in 2000 traveled to Japan to wrestle for Frontier Martial-Arts Wrestling, where they held the FMW Hardcore Tag Team Championship. The next year they returned to the United States to wrestle for Memphis Championship Wrestling, where again they held gold, holding the MCW Southern Tag Team Championship on three occasions in the span of one month.

In 2002 they returned to (the now renamed) World Wrestling Entertainment as enforcers for Raw brand General Manager Eric Bischoff. Now known as Jamal (Eddie) and Rosey (Matt), the team was used to squash any activity in the ring that Bischoff deemed "boring". They made their debut on the July 22 episode of Raw, interrupting a match between D'Lo Brown and Shawn Stasiak that had been previously allotted three minutes. When the time limit expired, Rosey and Jamal entered through the crowd and laid out both men, to the delight of Bischoff watching on from the entryway. The gimmick continued over the next few weeks, with Bischoff either giving people three minutes to entertain him before they were attacked, or otherwise deciding that three minutes of a segment was enough before the team appeared to end it. As a result of the time period, the team became known as Three Minute Warning.  One of their attacks was on Jeff Hardy, as ordered by Bischoff who thought Jeff was leaving for SmackDown to reunite with his brother Matt, only for the actual defector to be Jeff's scheduled opponent Crash.

For a time, the team used the 2 Skinnee J's song 3 Minutes as its entrance music. According to 2 Skinnee's guitarist, Lance Rockworthy, the band did not receive any compensation for the use of the song.

During the September 12 episode of SmackDown! Three Minute Warning and Eric Bischoff crashed the "commitment ceremony" being held for the Billy and Chuck tag team. Afterward Rico, Billy and Chuck's manager, started managing Three Minute Warning full-time. With Rico by their side they engaged in a feud with the Dudley Boyz (Bubba Ray and Spike) and Jeff Hardy which resulted in their highest-profile match as a team — an Elimination Tables match at the November Survivor Series, which they lost when Bubba Ray, the last man left for his team, received assistance from longtime partner D-Von.

The team stayed on the low- and mid-card until June 2003, when Jamal was released from WWE, reportedly after his involvement in a bar fight. Rosey then went to form a superhero tag-team with The Hurricane, winning the World Tag Team Championships in the process, while Jamal did a short stint in Total Nonstop Action Wrestling under his "Ekmo Fatu" name before returning to WWE.

They reunited one last time on WWE on a dark match for Sunday Night Heat as they defeated Trent Acid and Bison Bravado on January 9, 2006. Jamal was being repackaged as Umaga, and twice winning the Intercontinental Championship. Rosey was released by the company in March 2006. Umaga (Jamal) was released by the company in June 2009.

Deaths
Fatu (Jamal/Umaga) died December 4, 2009 in Houston, Texas from a toxic reaction from mixed drugs, which caused multiple heart attacks, the second leading to a fatal brain hemorrhage. Rosey died on April 17, 2017 in Pensacola, Florida from complications brought on by congestive heart failure.

Championships and accomplishments
Frontier Martial-Arts Wrestling
FMW/WEW Hardcore Tag Team Championship (1 time)
Heartland Wrestling Association
HWA Tag Team Championship (1 time)
Memphis Championship Wrestling
MCW Southern Tag Team Championship (3 times)
Wrestling Observer Newsletter awards
Worst Tag Team (2002)

See also
 Anoa'i family
 The Bloodline
 The Headshrinkers
 The Samoan Gangster Party

References

External links
Online World of Wrestling profile

Frontier Martial-Arts Wrestling teams and stables
Independent promotions teams and stables
Japanese promotions teams and stables
WWE teams and stables